Slender knotweed can refer to multiple plants:
Persicaria decipiens, native to Asia and Australia
Polygonum tenue, native to North America